The 2014 Food City 500 was a NASCAR Sprint Cup Series stock car race held on March 16, 2014, at Bristol Motor Speedway in Bristol, Tennessee. Contested over 503 laps – having been extended from the original distance of 500 laps in the prospect of a green–white–checker finish that ultimately did not occur due to weather – on the  concrete oval, it was the fourth race of the 2014 NASCAR Sprint Cup Series season. Carl Edwards won the race, his first of the season, while teammate Ricky Stenhouse Jr. finished second, while Aric Almirola, Tony Stewart, and Marcos Ambrose rounded out the top five. The top rookies of the race were Kyle Larson (10th), Austin Dillon (11th), and Justin Allgaier (17th).

Previous week's race
On the final lap of the Kobalt 400 at Las Vegas Motor Speedway, Dale Earnhardt Jr. ran out of gas exiting turn 2 and Brad Keselowski passed him to take the checkered flag. Keselowski praised his Team Penske organization, stating that they were "just doing everything so well right now", while also stating his pleasure with the victory and the added bonus of being a competitor in the Chase for the Sprint Cup later in the season, stating that he did not "have to hear all that crap all year long about not being in the Chase". Earnhardt Jr. was disappointed with the way that his race finished, describing running out of gas as "tough", while stating that he and his team "have got a good thing going, we've got to be positive. We've got to keep trying to win races. I know my fans are disappointed, but we got to stay positive".

Report

Background

The track's turns are banked from twenty-four to thirty degrees, while the front stretch, the location of the finish line, is banked from six to ten degrees. The back stretch also has banking from six to ten degrees. The track has a seating capacity of 160,000 people. The 2013 winner was Kasey Kahne.

Entry list
The entry list for the Food City 500 was released Monday, March 10 at 10:24 a.m. Eastern time. Forty-five drivers were entered for the race.

Practice

First practice
His younger brother Kyle Busch was among four drivers who wrecked their primary cars during the session. Danica Patrick slid, hit the wall in turn 4, ricocheted into Parker Kligerman and sent him into the wall. Kyle Busch and Greg Biffle were involved in a similar situation in the same session, while Justin Allgaier bounced off the turn 1 wall, having believed he had blown a right-front tire.

Qualifying

Hamlin stated that his lap was "faster than I ever imagined going around this track" and that "every new rule change we have just makes these cars go a little bit faster". Brad Keselowski joined Hamlin on the front row, missing out on pole by 0.003 seconds. He started that "if you're fast, you're fast and it shows through", while also praising Hamlin's car as "fast". Championship leader Dale Earnhardt Jr. could only qualify 14th, stating that he was "just too tight" on his opening run in qualifying, and that he also "kind of overshot the track a little bit".

Qualifying results

Practice (post-qualifying)

Final practice
Landon Cassill broke the rear-end housing and hit the wall hard during the session. He was forced to roll out his backup car and started from the rear because the change took place after qualifying.

Race

First half

Start
The race was scheduled to start at 1:13 p.m. Eastern time, but was delayed for almost two hours by heavy rain. The race finally got underway at 3:00 p.m. when Denny Hamlin led the field to the green flag. Brad Keselowski took the lead on lap two, and it did not take long before he started lapping cars in typical Bristol fashion. Joey Logano used a lapped car as a pick to get ahead of Keselowski for the lead on lap 42, shortly prior to a scheduled competition caution on lap 51 due to the earlier showers. Jimmie Johnson took just two tires and exited pit road as the leader. His teammate Jeff Gordon was exiting his stall when David Ragan was coming into his; Ragan came down across Gordon and got turned around. The race restarted on lap 58, before another caution on lap 60, due to debris in turn 2.

Rain delay
The race restarted on lap 65 and Parker Kligerman got loose and turned sideways in turn 3 bringing out the third caution of the race. He apparently ran over a battery pack that came off a car well in front of him, while his hood pins were carrying what appeared to be toilet paper. Alex Bowman stalled on the apron in turn 1 and needed a push from one of the safety trucks to get back to pit road. It was discovered that the battery pack on the track belonged to his car. The race restarted on lap 76 with Johnson still out front. He remained at the head of proceedings until lap 98, when Matt Kenseth took the lead. The right-front tire on Johnson's car started coming apart on lap 114. Unlike other short tracks Martinsville and Richmond, the right-side tires run with an inner-liner at Bristol, to prevent spinning after a tire blowout, and allowing the car to get to pit road to change the tire. As the incident occurred in green flag conditions, Johnson lost several laps. He was somewhat saved by the fourth caution of the race on lap 118 when the rain returned. Joey Logano was the first car one lap down, but pitted several times due to a power steering issue and lost three laps under that caution. Kenseth and Kurt Busch traded the lead on pit road, but Kenseth led off pit road and retook the lead. The rain started off as a light drizzle, but then intensified and the race was red flagged on lap 125. The track was dried enough that the drivers were called back to their cars after an hour and eleven minutes. Unfortunately, the rain picked up again and delayed the race for another hour and 45 minutes.

Restart
After the second delay, the cars started rolling back onto the track. The race restarted on lap 137, and Kurt Busch took the lead on lap 153. The fifth caution of the race flew on lap 156 when Cole Whitt came across the nose of Danica Patrick and got turned into the wall on the front stretch. Whitt's car slid down the surface in turn 1 right in front of the leaders. Timmy Hill slammed into the back of Kenseth, while trying to slow down. The race restarted on lap 167, with Jamie McMurray and Kurt Busch swapping the lead over the next three laps, before McMurray held the lead to a second competition caution, on lap 187, due to the rain delay. Clint Bowyer stayed out when the leaders pitted and he assumed the lead, while Kyle Busch won the race off pit road.

Second half

The race restarted on lap 193, and Kyle Busch took the lead from Bowyer, on lap 195. He held the lead for the next stint of the race, until Kasey Kahne took the lead on lap 268. Two laps later, Kyle Busch made an unscheduled stop after making contact with Dale Earnhardt Jr. which he felt had caused a flat tire. The seventh caution of the race flew on lap 276 after Ryan Truex hit the wall in turn 2, after a right-front tire blowout. Kahne swapped the lead with Hamlin on pit road, but Kahne exited pit road as the leader. The race restarted on lap 285 and Kahne lost the lead to Matt Kenseth. Kenseth maintained the lead throughout the next stint, before the eighth caution of the race flew on lap 332 after Michael McDowell turned David Ragan exiting turn 4. Kenseth traded the lead with Hamlin on pit road, but left pit road as the leader.

The race restarted on lap 339, and like the previous stint, Kenseth led throughout until the next caution flag – the ninth of the race – flew on lap 394 after Kyle Busch had a left-side tire go flat and spun out in turn 4, and was just clipped by his brother Kurt, which caused a similar puncture on his car. Travis Kvapil also hit the wall trying to avoid Kyle Busch. Once again, Kenseth and Hamlin traded the lead on pit road, but on this occasion, it was Kevin Harvick who would exit as the leader for the restart with 97 laps to go. The tenth caution of the race flew with 78 laps to go after Martin Truex Jr. cut down his left-rear tire, spun through 360 degrees and came to a stop at the exit of turn 2. Carl Edwards chose not to pit and assumed the lead for the restart with 71 laps to go. The eleventh caution of the race flew with 50 laps to go after Harvick had a broken gear that sent his car into the wall hard in turn 1. Keselowski hit the back of McMurray as both were trying to avoid hitting Harvick.

Final laps

Caution out of nowhere
The race restarted with 39 laps to go, with Edwards still at the head of the race, and remained so until the twelfth caution of the race flew with two laps to go after the manual override switch in the flag stand was activated, which turned on the caution lights. NASCAR vice-president of competition Robin Pemberton stated after the race that the organization "were scanning cars and spotters, and there's some of us in the tower that only heard it after the teams were talking about it because we were looking at other things around the racetrack". He added that the situation was where NASCAR “learn a lot of lessons, and when we learn a lesson like this we'll go in and further investigate some things" and that "there's probably some things that we needed to do to better secure that area where the manual override is on the lights".

Finish
Just as the field was being lined up to restart the race, rain started to fall once again. After 503 laps, a two-hour delay to start the race, a three-hour delay at the quarter mark and multiple rain showers, NASCAR called the end of the race and Carl Edwards took the victory at Bristol Motor Speedway. Edwards described his race as "awesome", after troubles on the previous day, stating that his car was "terrible on Saturday, so I'm just glad we turned it around". Ricky Stenhouse Jr. scored his best career finish with a runner up spot, stating that he had "a lot of fun" and that his team was "just slowly working and getting better and better", as he continued to improve results in his second full season in the Sprint Cup Series. Aric Almirola also scored his best career finish, at the time of the race, in third place.

Race results

Race statistics
 Lead changes: 20 among different drivers    
 Cautions/Laps: 12 for 95
 Red flags: 1 for 3 hours, 19 minutes and 0 seconds
 Time of race: 3 hours, 11 minutes and 23 seconds
 Average speed:

Media

Television

Radio

Standings after the race

Drivers' Championship standings

Manufacturers' Championship standings

Note: Only the first sixteen positions are included for the driver standings.

Notes

References

Food City 500
Food City 500
Food City 500
NASCAR races at Bristol Motor Speedway